Daniel Bachmann Andersen (born 1 June 1990) is a Danish equestrian athlete. He competed at the World Equestrian Games in Tryon 2018 and at the European Dressage Championships in 2015 and 2019.

Biography
Bachmann Andersen started riding at an age of 10 and became involved in dressage after he met Morten Thomsen, a Danish Olympian, who is from the same village as Daniel. Later he trained horses in Germany. After his riding career in Germany, he started working for Andreas Helgstrand. In 2014 he started for Blue Hors where he became successful with horses such as Zack, Don Olymbrio, Zepter, Loxana and Hotline. He became Danish national champion in 2019, fourth during the World Cup Finals in Göteborg and seventh in the individual freestyle during the European Championships in Rotterdam that same year. He was also 10th in the World Ranking with Zack. In 2020 he decided to go independent and to leave Blue Hors stud.

Bachmann Andersen won a team gold medal at the 2022 World Championships, which were held in Herning, Denmark.

Personal life
Daniel lives together with his Norwegian wife, Tiril, and their two children.

Dressage results

World Championships

European Championships

World Cup

Final

References

1990 births
Living people
Danish male equestrians
People from Sønderborg Municipality
Sportspeople from the Region of Southern Denmark